Same-sex marriage in Uruguay has been legal since August 5, 2013. A bill for legalization was passed by the Chamber of Representatives on December 12, 2012, in a vote of 81–6. The Senate approved it with some minor amendments on April 2, 2013, in a 23–8 vote. The amended bill was approved by the Chamber of Representatives in a 71–21 vote on April 10 and was signed into law by President José Mujica on May 3, 2013. Uruguay became the third country in South America, after Argentina and Brazil, and the fourteenth worldwide to legalize same-sex marriage.

On January 20, 2008, Uruguay became the first Latin American country to enact a national civil union law. Civil unions provide several of the rights of marriage.

Civil unions 
On January 20, 2008, Uruguay became the first Latin American country to enact a national civil union law, titled Ley de Unión Concubinaria.

The law, proposed by Senator Margarita Percovich of the Broad Front, was passed in the Chamber of Representatives on November 29, 2007, after having been passed in a similar form in the Senate in 2006. The bill was passed by both chambers in the same form on December 19, and signed into law by President Tabaré Vázquez on December 27. It was published in the official journal on January 10, 2008, and came into effect on January 20. The first union was performed on April 17, 2008.

Following the approval of the bill, both same-sex and opposite-sex couples are allowed to enter into a civil union after having lived together for at least five years, and are entitled to most of the benefits that married couples are afforded, including social security entitlements, inheritance rights and joint ownership of goods and property.

A government-backed bill allowing same-sex couples to adopt children was discussed in Parliament in the spring of 2008, receiving the support of President Vázquez and fierce opposition from the Catholic Church. The bill was approved by the Chamber of Representatives on August 27, 2009, by a 40–13 vote, and by the Senate on September 9 with a 17–6 vote. It was signed into law by Vázquez on September 18, 2009. Uruguay became the first country in South America to allow same-sex couples to jointly adopt.

Same-sex marriage 

On May 25, 2009, Senator Margarita Percovich announced that if the Broad Front won the national elections in October 2009 it would introduce a same-sex marriage bill to Parliament. In October, the Broad Front won an absolute majority in both chambers and José Mujica, the Broad Front presidential candidate, won the presidential election on November 29, 2009. In July 2010, legislators of the ruling party announced plans to submit a bill to legalise same-sex marriage. Michelle Suárez Bértora, the first transgender attorney in Uruguay, assisted in drafting the same-sex marriage legislation as part of her work with the LGBT rights organization Ovejas Negras ("Black Sheep"). On July 25, 2010, former President Julio María Sanguinetti of the Colorado Party declared his support for the legalization of same-sex marriage, while former President Luis Alberto Lacalle of the National Party stated his opposition.

In April 2011, Sebastián Sabini, a legislator of the Movement of Popular Participation, one of the parties consisting the Broad Front, presented the bill allowing same-sex couples to marry. The bill was formally submitted to the Chamber of Representatives on September 6, 2011.

In June 2012, a judicial court in Uruguay recognized a foreign same-sex marriage. The court ruled that local laws already permitted same-sex marriage, and that same-sex couples who married abroad may have their marriage recognized under Uruguayan law by a judge. However, the ruling was appealed.

In June 2012, Minister of Education and Culture Ricardo Ehrlich announced that the same-sex marriage bill would be debated in Parliament before the end of 2012. On July 4, 2012, the Chamber of Representatives' Constitutional and Legislative Affairs Committee started the debate on the legislation. The committee initially approved the bill on November 28, 2012, and on December 5 it amended the bill and gave its final approval. On December 12, the Chamber of Representatives approved the bill by a vote of 81–6 with no abstentions, and sent it to the Senate. On March 19, 2013, the Senate's Constitutional and Legislative Affairs Committee passed the bill with some minor amendments. The Senate approved the amended bill on April 2, 2013, in a 23–8 vote. On April 10, 2013, the Chamber of Representatives approved the amended bill in a 71–21 vote. The bill was signed into law by President José Mujica on May 3, and took effect on August 5, 2013.

The first same-sex marriage took place on August 5, 2013. The wedding was officiated in extremis at a hospital in Montevideo.

Presidential candidate Luis Lacalle Pou of the National Party stated in an interview with El País in October 2018 that despite having voted against the same-sex marriage law as a deputy, should he be elected president his government would not overturn the same-sex marriage law. Lacalle Pou was elected president in the 2019 general election.

Statistics
In the first year following the law's entry into force, 134 same-sex couples had married in Montevideo and the surrounding metropolitan area. Approximately 200 same-sex couples had married in the whole country.

In 2016, estimates from the Faculty of Social Sciences at the University of the Republic showed that about 60.3% of relationships in Uruguay involved married opposite-sex couples, 38.4% unmarried opposite-sex couples, 0.6% opposite-sex couples in civil unions, 0.2% married same-sex couples, 0.5% unmarried same-sex couples and 0.1% same-sex couples in civil unions. These numbers remained relatively unchanged in 2017. The estimates also showed that unemployment among same-sex partners stood at 3.4% (compared to 4.7% among heterosexual partners) and that same-sex partners were more likely to have completed tertiary education (41%, compared to 19% among heterosexual partners).

Public opinion 
A Factum poll conducted in November 2011 found that 52% of the population supported same-sex marriage, 32% were opposed, 10% were neutral and 6% had no opinion.

According to a Cifra poll conducted between November 29 and December 6, 2012, 53% of Uruguayans supported same-sex marriage, 32% were opposed and 15% had no opinion. The survey also showed that support for same-sex marriage was highest among Broad Front voters (62%), and lower among voters from the Colorado Party and the National Party (both 42%). Another Cifra poll, conducted between February 22 and March 4, 2013, found that 54% of respondents supported same-sex marriage, 32% were opposed, 9% were undecided and 4% had no opinion.

According to a Pew Research Center survey conducted between November 22, 2013, and January 8, 2014, 62% of Uruguayans supported same-sex marriage, while 31% were opposed.

According to the 2014 AmericasBarometer (published in June 2015), 71% of Uruguayans were in favour of same-sex marriage. This level of support was the second highest among the 28 American countries polled, behind only Canada. 53% "strongly" supported same-sex marriage, while 17% "strongly" opposed it; with the remaining being "somewhat" in support or in opposition or had no opinion. Additionally, support was higher among young people: 79% and 80% of 18–25-year-olds and 26–35-year-olds supported same-sex marriage, respectively. Among people over the age of 66, support was 51%.

The 2017 AmericasBarometer showed that 75% of Uruguayans supported same-sex marriage.

See also 
 LGBT rights in Uruguay
 Recognition of same-sex unions in the Americas

References

External links 
 

2013 in LGBT history
LGBT rights in Uruguay
Uruguay
Marriage, unions and partnerships in Uruguay
José Mujica